Tortyra argentifascia is a moth of the family Choreutidae. It is known from Mexico.

References

Tortyra
Moths described in 1914